Maria Lorena González (born February 20, 1977) is an American lawyer and former politician who was a member of the Seattle City Council from position 9. She was the first Latina elected to the council. She was a candidate for mayor of Seattle in 2021 but was defeated by Bruce Harrell 59 percent to 41 percent.

Early life and education
González was born on February 20, 1977, in Prosser, Washington and raised in Grandview. She has five siblings. Her parents came to the United States as undocumented immigrants in the early-1960s and became legal permanent residents in the 1970s. Her mother became a citizen in 1996. She described her early life as a "Spanish-speaking migrant farmworker household." González was crowned Grandview Miss Junior in 1994.

González attended Yakima Valley College at the Grandview Campus and earned a degree in business from Washington State University in 1999. During this time, she says she worked three jobs and relied on assistance from scholarships to pay for her education. She moved to Seattle in 2002 and began attending the Seattle University School of Law, earning her Juris Doctor in 2005.

Career
After graduating from law school, González became an attorney at Gordon Thomas Honeywell. In 2012, she represented a Latino man in a civil rights case against the city of Seattle for discriminatory police conduct. Her client received a $150,000 settlement, but she told  The Seattle Times that the Seattle Police Department seemed incapable of admitting that the incident was an example of biased policing. In 2014, she became legal counsel to Seattle Mayor Ed Murray.

Seattle City Council
In 2015, González ran for the ninth position on the Seattle City Council after Sally J. Clark dropped her reelection bid for one of the two remaining at-large seats on the council. González won the election with more than 78% of the vote, and replaced John Okamoto, who was temporarily on the council after Clark resigned to take a job at the University of Washington. González was the first Latina to be elected to the council. In 2017, González was reelected to office with more than 70% of the vote.

González was selected as the Council President in January 2020, succeeding Bruce Harrell. González was a supporter of the Bernie Sanders 2020 presidential campaign.

2020 attorney general campaign

On August 8, 2019, González announced her intention to run for state attorney general in the 2020 election, to replace Bob Ferguson who was expected to run for governor. She also announced her intention of continuing to work on the Seattle City Council during the campaign. On August 22, 2019, González suspended her campaign following Ferguson's decision to run for re-election after Jay Inslee announced he was running for a third term as governor.

2021 Seattle mayoral election 

In February 2020, González announced her candidacy for the 2021 Seattle mayoral election.
She came in a close second in the top-two primary, trailing Bruce Harrell by less than four thousand votes but was defeated in the November general election by Bruce Harrell, by a margin of 59% to 41%.

Personal life
González has lived in Seattle since 2002 as a resident of the Capitol Hill, First Hill, Ballard, South Park, and White Center neighborhoods. Lorena currently resides in West Seattle's Alaska Junction. She married her husband in November 2017 and they have a daughter.

Electoral history

2015 election

2017 election

References

External links
 Seattle City Council webpage
 Campaign website

1977 births
21st-century American women politicians
21st-century American politicians
Candidates in the 2021 United States elections
Hispanic and Latino American women in politics
Living people
People from Prosser, Washington
Seattle City Council members
Washington (state) Democrats
Women city councillors in Washington (state)